Sea Venom is an Anglo-French lightweight anti-ship missile developed by MBDA to equip the French Navy and the Royal Navy. The missile is known as Anti-Navire Léger (ANL) in France and Sea Venom (formerly "Future Anti-Surface Guided Weapon (Heavy)") in the United Kingdom. While initial operating capability had been expected with the Royal Navy in 2022, Sea Venom missiles were reported deployed with Royal Navy Wildcat helicopters operating as part of the Royal Navy's carrier strike group in 2021. The first test launch, from an AS365 Dauphin helicopter of the French DGA defence procurement agency, was successfully conducted on 21 June 2017.

Design
Sea Venom is designed as a successor to the French Navy's AS 15 TT and Royal Navy's Sea Skua missiles. When in service, Sea Venom will equip Eurocopter Panther and NH90 helicopters in the French Navy and Wildcat helicopters in the Royal Navy. Due to shared characteristics with its predecessors, MBDA claims Sea Venom will be able to readily integrate onto platforms that are already carrying Sea Skua and AS 15 TT.

Much like its predecessors, Sea Venom is designed to attack surface targets, such as fast in-shore attack craft ranging in size of between 50–500 tonnes, as well as larger surface targets of up to corvette size. With its 30 kg warhead, the missile is also capable of inflicting significant damage to larger vessels through precision aim point selection, and can also attack static land-based targets. Whilst its precise range is currently unknown, MBDA has stated that the missile has a "long" stand-off range enabling it to be launched from beyond the reach of most modern air defence systems. The missile is capable of several attack modes including sea skimming and "pop up/top attack." Sea Venom uses an infrared seeker with the option of "man in the loop" track-via-missile guidance via data-link; the high speed two-way data-link transmits the images "seen" by the seeker back to the operator, enabling them to remain in control of the missile throughout its flight in addition to having an autonomous engagement capability.

MBDA is also working on a surface-launched variant of the missile.

History
The Royal Navy declared Sea Venom an initial operating capability in May 2021 when it deployed them as part of United Kingdom Carrier Strike Group 21 on its maiden deployment to the Pacific. The missile equipped four Wildcat HMA2 helicopters embarked on the strike group's accompanying destroyers.

See also
 Martlet (missile) - the "Future Anti-Surface Guided Weapon (Light)" equivalent

References

External links
www.defenseindustrydaily.com
www.janes.com - Farnborough 2014

Anti-ship missiles of the United Kingdom
United Kingdom defence procurement
Weapons and ammunition introduced in 2021